Adult Contemporary is a chart published by Billboard ranking the top-performing songs in the United States in the adult contemporary music (AC) market.  In 1968, 13 songs topped the chart, then published under the title Easy Listening, based on playlists submitted by easy listening radio stations and sales reports submitted by stores.

On the first chart of the year, the number one spot was held by Harpers Bizarre with their version of Glenn Miller's 1941 song "Chattanooga Choo Choo".  It would prove to be the only Billboard chart-topper of the sunshine pop band's career, and after 1968 they would not achieve any further hits.  Other acts to top the chart for the first time in 1968 included Brazilian bandleader Sérgio Mendes, who reached number one for the first time with a version of "The Fool on the Hill", originally recorded by The Beatles.  After a lengthy period without further major success, Mendes would achieve a second number one 15 years after the first when he made a comeback in 1983.

The longest-running number one of 1968 was French orchestra leader Paul Mauriat's instrumental version of a song which had originally been Luxembourg's entry to the 1967 Eurovision Song Contest, "Love is Blue". Mauriat's recording spent 11 consecutive weeks in the top spot, setting a new record for the Easy Listening chart which would stand for 25 years until broken by Billy Joel in 1993.  The song also topped Billboards all-genres chart, the Hot 100, although it would prove to be Mauriat's last major hit in the United States.  The final Easy Listening number one of the year was "Wichita Lineman" by Glen Campbell.

Chart history

References

See also
1968 in music
List of artists who reached number one on the U.S. Adult Contemporary chart

1968
1968 record charts